Dol pri Pristavi is a settlement just northwest of Pristava pri Mestinju in eastern Slovenia. It belongs to the Municipality of Šmarje pri Jelšah. The area is part of the traditional region of Styria and is now included in the Savinja Statistical Region. The railway line from Celje to Zagreb runs through the settlement.

Name
The name of the settlement was changed from Dol to Dol pri Pristavi in 1953.

References

External links
Dol pri Pristavi at Geopedia

Populated places in the Municipality of Šmarje pri Jelšah